The Weather Man is a 2005 American dark comedy-drama film directed by Gore Verbinski, written by Steve Conrad, and starring Nicolas Cage in the lead role, Michael Caine and Hope Davis. It tells the story of a weatherman in the midst of a mid-life crisis.

The film was released on October 28, 2005, and grossed $19 million worldwide.

Plot
A successful weatherman at a Chicago news program, David Spritz (Nicolas Cage) is well paid but garners little respect from people in the area who throw fast food at him, David suspects, because they're resentful of how easy his high-paying job is.  Dave also feels overshadowed by his father, Pulitzer Prize-winning author Robert Spritzel (Michael Caine), who is disappointed in Dave's apparent inability to grow up and deal with his two children.  The situation worsens when Robert is diagnosed with lymphoma and given only a few months to live.  As he becomes more and more depressed, Dave takes up archery, finding the activity a way to build his focus and calm his nerves.

David later remembers a conversation between himself and his father, where his father explains to him that "the harder thing to do and the right thing to do are often the same thing" and that "nothing that has meaning is easy". David appreciates this advice but struggles to implement it.

To prove himself to his father and possibly reconcile with Noreen (Hope Davis), his estranged wife, Dave pursues a weatherman position with a national talk show called Hello America. The job would nearly quadruple his salary, but means relocating to New York City.  When Hello America invites him to New York, he takes his daughter, Shelly (Gemmenne de la Peña), with him and bonds with her by helping her shop for a more suitable wardrobe.  While away, Dave learns that his son Mike (Nicholas Hoult) attacked his counselor, Don Bowden (Gil Bellows), claiming that the man wanted to perform oral sex on him.  Despite this stress and an all-night drinking binge, Dave impresses the Hello America interviewers and is eventually offered the job.

When he returns, Dave slaps Russ (Michael Rispoli), Noreen's boyfriend, when he finds him dealing with his son's predicament. Dave later confronts the counselor at his home, beating him up and warning him that he is in store for worse.

The family holds a living funeral for Robert organised by Dave's mother, Lauren (Judith McConnell), in which Dave asks Noreen to reconcile and move to New York, but she has decided to marry Russ. Dave and Robert have one final talk, in which Dave breaks down in tears, unsure of his life's choices. Robert consoles him, telling him that he has time to "chuck" the garbage of his life. Robert dies soon after.

The film ends several months later, after Dave has accepted the job and moved to New York.  People have ceased throwing things at him though, he muses, this may be a pleasant side-effect of his archery hobby, for which he carries a bow.

Cast
 Nicolas Cage as David Spritz (real name David Spritzel)
 Michael Caine as Robert Spritzel 
 Hope Davis as Noreen
 Nicholas Hoult as Mike Spritzel
 Gemmenne de la Peña as Shelly Spritzel
 Michael Rispoli as Russ
 Gil Bellows as Don Bowden
 Judith McConnell as Lauren Spritzel
 Tom Skilling as WGN Assistant Director
The film also includes cameos from media figures such as Bryant Gumbel, Ed McMahon, Cristina Ferrare, and Wolfgang Puck.

Reception
The Weather Man received an overall score of 59% on Rotten Tomatoes and has an average rating of 6.1/10 based on 136 reviews. The site's consensus states: "With fine performances and a dark, dry sense of humor, The Weather Man is mostly cloudy with occasional rays of sunshine." It has a 61 out of 100 score on Metacritic, sampled from 37 critics, indicating "generally favorable reviews".

The film was released in North America on October 28, 2005, and ran for nearly eight weeks (precisely 54 days). It grossed $12.5 million in the US and $6.6 million internationally, for a total of $19 million.

References

External links

 
 
 
 
 

2005 films
2005 comedy-drama films
American comedy-drama films
Escape Artists films
Films directed by Gore Verbinski
Films set in Chicago
Films shot in Chicago
Paramount Pictures films
Films scored by Hans Zimmer
Midlife crisis films
Cultural depictions of weather presenters
2005 comedy films
2005 drama films
Films about weather
2000s English-language films
2000s American films